Events in the year 1861 in Iceland.

Incumbents 

 Monarch: Frederick VII of Denmark
 Council President of Denmark: Carl Christian Hall

Births 

 4 December − Hannes Hafstein, politician and poet.

References 

 
1860s in Iceland
Years of the 19th century in Iceland
Iceland
Iceland